Australia was the host nation for the 1956 Summer Olympics in Melbourne, Australia.  However, due to Australian quarantine restrictions the  equestrian events were held in Stockholm, Sweden. 294 competitors, 250 men and 44 women, took part in 140 events in 18 sports.

Medalists

Gold
 Betty Cuthbert – athletics, women's 100 metres
 Betty Cuthbert – athletics, women's 200 metres
 Shirley Strickland – athletics, women's 80 m Hurdles
 Norma Croker, Betty Cuthbert, Fleur Wenham, and Shirley Strickland – athletics, women's 4 × 100 m Relay
 Joey Browne and Anthony Marchant — Cycling, men's 2000 m Tandem
 Jon Henricks — Swimming, men's 100 m Freestyle
 Murray Rose — Swimming, men's 400 m Freestyle
 Murray Rose — Swimming, men's 1500 m Freestyle
 David Theile — Swimming, men's 100 m Backstroke
 John Devitt, Jon Henricks, Kevin O'Halloran, and Murray Rose — Swimming, men's 4 × 200 m Freestyle Relay
 Dawn Fraser — Swimming, women's 100 m Freestyle
 Lorraine Crapp — Swimming, women's 400 m Freestyle
 Lorraine Crapp, Dawn Fraser, Faith Leech, and Sandra Morgan — Swimming, women's 4 × 100 m Freestyle Relay

Silver
 Graham Gipson, Kevan Gosper, Leon Gregory, and David Lean – athletics, men's 4 × 400 m Relay
 Chilla Porter – athletics, men's High Jump
 Stuart Mackenzie – rowing, men's Single Sculls
 John Devitt — Swimming, men's 100 m Freestyle
 John Monckton — Swimming, men's 100 m Backstroke
 Lorraine Crapp — Swimming, women's 100 m Freestyle
 Dawn Fraser — Swimming, women's 400 m Freestyle
 John Scott and Roland Tasker — Sailing, men's Sharpie 12 m²

Bronze
 Hector Hogan – athletics, men's 100 metres
 John Landy – athletics, men's 1500 metres
 Allan Lawrence – athletics, men's 10.000 metres
 Norma Thrower – athletics, women's 80 m Hurdles
 Marlene Mathews – athletics, women's 100 metres
 Marlene Mathews – athletics, women's 200 metres
 Kevin Hogarth — Boxing, men's Welterweight
 Walter Brown and Dennis Green – canoeing, men's K2 10,000 m Kayak Pairs
 Dick Ploog — Cycling, men's 1000 m Sprint (Scratch)
 Murray Riley and Mervyn Wood – rowing, men's Double Sculls
 Michael Aikman, Angus Benfield, David Boykett, Bryan Doyle, Harold Hewitt, Jim Howden, Walter Howell, Garth Manton, and Adrian Monger – rowing, men's Eights
 Gary Chapman — Swimming, men's 100 m Freestyle
 Faith Leech — Swimming, women's 100 m Freestyle
 Douglas Buxton, Devereaux Mytton, Ernest Wagstaff and Jock Sturrock — Sailing, men's 5½ Meter Class

Athletics

Men
Track & road events

Field events

Combined events – Decathlon

Women
Track & road events

Field events

Basketball

Men's Team Competition

Preliminary round

Group D

Classification 9–15

Group 1

Classification matches

Team Roster
 Peter Demos
 Geoff Heskett
 Peter Bumbers
 Stan Dargis
 Inga Freidenfelds
 Colin Burdett
 George Dancis
 Peter Sutton
 Algis Ignatavicius
 Merv Moy
 Ken Finch
 Bruce Flick
Head coach: Ken Watson

Boxing

Men

Canoeing

Sprint
Men

Women

Cycling

Road

Track
1000m time trial

Sprint

Tandem

Pursuit

Diving

Men

Women

Fencing

21 fencers, 18 men and 3 women, represented Australia in 1956.
 Men
Ranks given are within the pool.

 Women
Ranks given are within the pool.

Football

First round

Quarter-finals

Men's team squads
Head coach: Richard Telfer

Gymnastics

Hockey

Preliminary round

Pool B

Play–off match

Men's Team Competition
Team Roster
 Alan Barblett
 Geoffrey Bennett
 Brian Booth
 Kevin Carton
 Kenneth Clarke
 Ian Dick
 John Dwyer
 Maurice Foley
 Louis Hailey
 Glen Jobson
 Dennis Kemp
 Keith Leeson
 Donald Mecklem
 Eric Pearce
 Gordon Pearce
 Melville Pearce
 Kenneth Reid
 Raymond Whiteside

Modern pentathlon

Three male pentathletes represented Australia in 1956.

Individual
 Neville Sayers
 Sven Coomer
 George Nicoll

Team
 Neville Sayers
 Sven Coomer
 George Nicoll

Rowing

Australia had 26 male rowers participate in all seven rowing events in 1956.

Men

Sailing

Open

Shooting

Twelve shooters represented Australia in 1956.
Men

Swimming

Men

Women

Water polo

Preliminary round
The preliminary round consisted of a round-robin tournament held in three groups.  Each team played the other teams in its group once.

Group A

28 November
 14:00 - Romania def. Australia, 4-2
29 November
 22:15 - Yugoslavia def. Australia, 9-1
30 November
 16:00 - Soviet Union def. Australia, 3-0

Consolation

 Great Britain def. Australia, 5-2
 Australia def. Singapore, 3-2
 Romania def. Australia, 4-2

Weightlifting

Men

Wrestling

References

Nations at the 1956 Summer Olympics
1956
Olympics